Olivia Jane Hamnett (1942/1943 – 2 November 2001) was an English actress known for numerous television roles in Australia, primarily in soap operas and miniseries. including  The Sullivans as Meg Fulton in 1979, in Prisoner as Dr. Kate Peterson,  who was a supporting cast member in 1981–82 and in Return to Eden 1983 & 1985 as Joanna Randall

Biography
Hamnett was born c. 1942/1943, in St Helens, Lancashire, England. She started her acting career in her native England in theatre, and moved into television roles  in the early 1960s, she had numerous guest roles on television programs including Department S and Randall and Hopkirk (Deceased) in 1969. However she found greater success in Australia in television and film after emigrating there in the 1970s. 
 
Hammett initially had small roles in series such as Bellbird, as well as a number of the Crawford Production staples.

Before being cast in larger roles, where she was probably best known for her performances in cult series Prisoner as Dr. Kate Peterson and The Sullivans as Meg Fulton and also in both the original mini-series and then the regular series of Return to Eden
 
She also played major roles on such series as Rush, The Power, The Passion, Chances, Pacific Drive, Neighbours and Blue Heelers

Hamnett portrayed Richard Chamberlain's wife in The Last Wave (1977), and played Ricky Schroder's mother in The Earthling (1980).

Personal life
Hamnett was married to actor Peter Regan. Hamnett died in 2001 from a brain tumour.

Filmography

FILM
 

TELEVISION

References

External links

2001 deaths
Actresses from Manchester
Australian film actresses
Australian soap opera actresses
Neurological disease deaths in Australia
Deaths from cancer in Australia
Deaths from brain tumor
English film actresses
English soap opera actresses
English television actresses
English emigrants to Australia
20th-century Australian actresses
20th-century English actresses
21st-century Australian actresses
21st-century English actresses
Year of birth uncertain